Raymond Herrera is an American musician and entrepreneur, best known as the former drummer and founding member of the heavy metal band Fear Factory. He is the former drummer for his previous band Brujeria and for industrial metal band Arkaea. He is a composer and producer of music for video games, television, feature films, and transmedia.

Career
His commercial album debut was Fear Factory's Soul of a New Machine in 1992. The band soon began a nearly two decade long recording and touring schedule including more than twelve commercial album releases and numerous world tours. He is known for his high speed playing, particularly his "stop go" double bass technique rather than the usual "flooring face" style.

In 1996, Herrera started to secure music licensing of Fear Factory's music for dozens of video games. He started Herrera Productions (renamed 3volution Productions in 2003) and worked as composer-producer on numerous video games. This includes the first  two Tom Clancy's Ghost Recon Advanced Warfighter, Tom Clancy's Rainbow Six: Lockdown, Scarface: The World is Yours, and Iron Man 2.

In 2006, Herrera started the recording studio Temple Studios LLC and co-created the beverage company Redux Beverages LLC. In 2008, he played drums with Arkaea, including former Fear Factory band member Christian Olde Wolbers, and Jon Howard and Pat Kavanagh from Threat Signal. The band released the album Years in the Darkness. In 2009, he started Alt-Strum Productions (ASP). In 2010, he co-created Freedom To Rock, a 501c3 non-profit organization, and is on the board of directors. In 2011–2012, Herrera worked with Power A to help develop the FUS1ON Gaming controller.

In 2013 Raymond joined Capital Source Network (CSN), a company Raymond helped create. Capital Source Network is a beverage industry one-stop shop, specializing in brokering, test marketing, distribution and financial services. CSN represents a wide variety of brands, from vitamin enhanced waters to energy supplements. The company has offices in California, Indiana and Michigan.

In 2015 Raymond started 3volution Organics with his wife Paula Herrera. The company specializes in organic products in the natural industry. The company started in the west coast region of California. The company became a national broker in 2017 and has expanded into E-Commerce and international Brick and Mortar and international E-commerce in early 2021.
https://3volutionorganics.net/

Games

Discography

With Fear Factory

 Concrete (recorded in 1991 and released on July 30, 2002)
 Soul of a New Machine (1992)
 Demanufacture (1995)
 Obsolete (1998)
 Digimortal (2001)
 Archetype (2004)
 Transgression (2005)

With Brujeria
 Matando Güeros (1993)
 Raza Odiada (1995)
 Brujerizmo (2000)

With Asesino
 Corridos de Muerte (2002)

With Phobia
 Return to Desolation (1994)

With Arkaea
 Years in the Darkness (2009)

Equipment & Endorsements
Pro-mark drum sticks
Zildjian cymbals
DW pedals (5000 series)
Attack drum heads
Tama Drums

Power Tower custom rack system, Tama hardware including Wide Rider drum throne, two DW5000 bass drum pedals, Attack drum heads, ddrum4 triggers, Korg D1200 studio and Pro-Mark 5A Oakwood nylon tip sticks. More details about his drum setup available.

References

American heavy metal drummers
American musicians of Mexican descent
Living people
Nu metal drummers
20th-century American drummers
American male drummers
Brujeria (band) members
Fear Factory members
Asesino members
21st-century American drummers
20th-century American male musicians
21st-century American male musicians
Hispanic and Latino American musicians
Year of birth missing (living people)